Iran Bioinformatics Center (IBC) is the only academic center in Iran working on Bioinformatics. Although there are some independent research groups such as Bioinformatics and Biomathematics Unit in Mazandaran University of Medical Sciences working on Bioinformatics but IBC is a part of Institute of Biochemistry and Biophysics (IBB) in Tehran University. IBC offers a Ph.D. program for Bioinformatics.

See also
Institute of Biochemistry and Biophysics
Tehran University
Bioinformatics and Biomathematics Unit
Bioinformatics

External links
Iran Bioinformatics Center
Institute of Biophysics and Biochemistry 
Bioinformatics Center  of Institute of Bio-IT 

University of Tehran
Bioinformatics organizations